The Maintenance Operation Protocol (MOP) is used for utility services such as uploading and downloading system software, remote testing and problem diagnosis.  It was a proprietary protocol of Digital Equipment Corporation.
MOP frames can be one of the following commands:

See also
Reverse Address Resolution Protocol (RARP)

References

Digital Equipment Corporation
System administration
Booting